The Kanto Open was a professional golf tournament in Japan. It was founded in 1950 and was last played in 1999. It was an event on the Japan Golf Tour from 1973 to 1991. It was played in September at a variety of courses in the Kantō region.

Winners
this list may be incomplete
1999 Hisayuki Sasaki
1998 
1997 Akihito Yokoyama
1996 Keiichiro Fukabori
1995 Yutaka Hagawa
1994 Hisayuki Sasaki
1993 Takaaki Fukuzawa
1992 Tatsuya Shiraishi
1991 Yoshinori Kaneko
1990 Ryoken Kawagishi
1989 Yoshi Mizumaki
1988 Akihito Yokoyama
1987 Yoshikazu Yokoshima
1986 Isao Aoki
1985 Seiichi Kanai
1984 Tsuneyuki Nakajima
1983 Saburo Fujiki
1982 Masashi Ozaki
1981 Nobumitsu Yuhara
1980 Isao Aoki
1979 Masaru Amono
1978 Seiichi Kanai
1977 Masashi Ozaki
1976 Masashi Ozaki
1975 Isao Aoki
1974 Isao Aoki
1973 Takashi Kurihara
1972 Masashi Ozaki
1971 Hsieh Yung-yo
1970 Hsieh Yung-yo
1969 Hsieh Yung-yo
1968 Hsieh Min-Nan
1967 Takaaki Kono
1966 Takao Hara
1965 Tomoo Ishii
1964 Izumi Mori
1963 Tomoo Ishii
1962 Chen Ching-Po
1961 Haruyoshi Kobari
1960 Yoshiro Hayashi
1959 Haruyoshi Kobari
1958 Torakichi Nakamura
1957 Torakichi Nakamura
1956 Torakichi Nakamura
1955 Yoshiro Hayashi
1954
1953 Torakichi Nakamura
1952 Torakichi Nakamura
1951 Torakichi Nakamura
1950 Torakichi Nakamura

References

External links
Coverage on Japan Golf Tour's official site

Former Japan Golf Tour events
Defunct golf tournaments in Japan
Recurring sporting events established in 1950
Recurring sporting events disestablished in 1999